Aydın Büyükşehir Belediyespor is the women's volleyball department of Aydın Büyükşehir Belediyespor Kulübü, a Turkish sports club based in Aydın, Turkey. The team plays its home matches at the Mimar Sinan Spor Salonu hall in Aydın.

Aydın Büyükşehir Belediyespor competed in European cups for the first time in its history in the 2018-19 season, played in the final in the CEV Women's Challenge Cup and won the second medal.

History
Aydın Belediyegücü Sports Club, the sports club of Aydın Municipality that was established in 2010, was changed to Aydın Büyükşehir Belediyespor Club on 11 July 2014. The volleyball branch of the club, which was established as a total of 30 branches under Aydın Büyükşehir Belediyespor Club, competed in the Women's Away Regional League L Group in the first year of its establishment. Although it was his first year, he completed his group in the 2nd place with 8 wins and achieved the success of promotion to the 3rd League.

Playing in the Women's Aroma 3rd League Group A in the 2010-2011 season, Aydın Büyükşehir Belediyespor (Aydın Belediyegücü Spor), 3. In his first year in the league, he finished 9th with 6 wins and 14 losses in 20 matches.

In the 2012-2013 season, he took 2 wins and 18 losses in 20 matches, taking the 11th place in the relegation line, falling to the Regional League in his second year in the 3rd League.

Aydın Büyükşehir Belediyespor (Aydın Belediyegücü Spor), which started the 2013-2014 season with the goal of the 3rd League, was promoted to the 3rd League again as the champion of the Regional League C-Denizli group.

He managed to stay in the league in the 2014-2015 season.

Playing in the 2015-2016 Season 3rd League Women 1st Group, Aydın Büyükşehir Belediyespor finished in 11th place with 2 wins in 21 matches and relegated again.

Aydın Büyükşehir Belediyespor, who succeeded in playing the play-offs in the 2016-2017 season, finished the Play-off B GROUP - (İZMİR) group behind the leader MUĞLA BODRUM İHTİSAS with 2 wins and 1 defeat and was promoted again.

With the removal of the 3rd League in the 2017-2018 season, Aydın Büyükşehir Belediyespor, who will compete in the 2nd League Women's 3rd Group, finished in 11th place again.

When we came to the 2018-2019 season, it bought the rights of Bursa Büyükşehir Belediyespor to participate in the Sultans League and CEV Challenge Cup. Having made a good start to the Vestel Venus Sultans League, Aydın Büyükşehir Belediyespor defeated Turkish Airlines (women's volleyball team) in the first week, Çanakkale Belediyespor in the second week, and Karayolları in the third week with a score of 3-0. Aydın Büyükşehir Belediyespor finished on the dam stage in the second place, Aydın Büyükşehir Belediyespor, which faced Karayolları, Çanakkale Belediyespor and Halkbank in the dam stage, won 3 wins and 3 defeats in 6 matches and completed the dam stage in the 3rd place.

As a result of the addition of the points received at the end of the dam matches to the league matches, it finished in the 10th place as in the league stage and managed to hold on to the league. Playing in the CEV Challenge Cup in the same season, Aydın Büyükşehir Belediyespor matched with Beşiktaş in the last 16 rounds. Aydın Büyükşehir Belediyespor lost 3-1 on the road in the first match, won 3-0 in the second leg of the tour and the match was extended to the golden set. Aydın Büyükşehir Belediyespor won the gold set 15-12 and reached the final of 8. In the final of 8, Aydın Büyükşehir Belediyespor matched with Belgium's Hermes Oostende team, winning the first game 3-0 in Aydın and 3-2 on the road, reaching the quarter-finals. In the quarter-finals, his rival Greek team A.O. Thiras won the first match 3-2 on the road and 3-0 in Aydın and reached the semi-finals. Its opponent in the semifinal was Gen-I Volley Nova Gorica, the Slovenian team. The first match was won 3-2 on the road and 3-1 in Aydın and reached the finals. Its rival in the final was Italy's strongest team Saugella Team Monza. Saugella Team Monza won the first match in Aydın with the set scores of 15-25, 23-25, 17-25. The away game was Saugella Team Monza, who won 3-1 with the set scores of 25–20, 17–25, 25–22, and 25–15. Aydın Büyükşehir Belediyespor finished second in the CEV Challenge Cup, in which it competed for the first time in its history.

finished the 2019-2020 season 7th in the regular season in the Sultans League and qualified for the play-offs, but due to COVID-19, the play-off matches were canceled and the league was registered.

Honours

International competitions
  CEV Challenge Cup
 Runners-up (1): 2019

Team Roster

Technical Staff

Notable players

Domestic Players

 Erçe Su Kasapoğlu
 Ezgi Dilik
 Meryem Boz
 Bihter Dumanoğlu
 Ece Hocaoğlu
 Ezgi Dağdelenler
 Fulden Ural
 Ecem Alıcı
 Aslıhan Kılıç
 Hazal Selin Arifoğlu

European Players

 Celeste Plak
 Maret Grothues

 Stella Christodoulou

Non-European Players

 Brayelin Martínez
 Jineiry Martínez

 Rachael Adams

Players written in italic still play for the club.

References 

https://www.trtspor.com.tr/haber/voleybol/bayanlar-avrupa-kupalari/aydin-buyuksehir-belediyespor-finalde-179160.html
https://www.hurriyet.com.tr/sporarena/aydin-buyuksehir-belediyespor-finalde-41140427
https://www.yenibakis.com.tr/bu-gurur-aydin-in/100965/
https://www.ntvspor.net/voleybol/aydin-buyuksehir-belediyespor-finalde-5c800b13bf791021a42fd32d
 Anadolu Agency Aydin BB to face Saugella in CEV Volleyball Cup Final

External links 
 

Women's volleyball teams in Turkey
Turkish volleyball clubs